Ximena Escalera (born 6 January 1980) is a Bolivian swimmer. She competed in the women's 100 metre backstroke at the 1996 Summer Olympics.

References

1980 births
Living people
Bolivian female swimmers
Olympic swimmers of Bolivia
Swimmers at the 1996 Summer Olympics
Place of birth missing (living people)
21st-century Bolivian women